Aznab-e Sofla may refer to:
 Aznab-e Sofla, East Azerbaijan
 Aznab-e Sofla, Kermanshah